Pre-code may refer to:

 Pre-Code Hollywood (1927–1934), the American film industry between the adoption of sound and the Motion Picture Production Code 
 Comics produced before the Comics Code Authority was formed in 1954
 Zero-forcing precoding, a method of spatial signal processing
 Precoding, in multi-antenna wireless communications

See also
Hays Code, or the Motion Picture Production Code
Golden Age of Comic Books
Single-carrier FDMA, or linearly precoded OFDMA, a frequency-division multiple access scheme